Byun Hye-young (also Byeon Hye-yeong, ; born June 17, 1983) is a South Korean former swimmer, who specialized in breaststroke events. She represented South Korea in two editions of the Olympic Games (1996 and 2000), and eventually became a top 20 finalist at the 2003 Summer Universiade in Daegu.

Byun made her Olympic debut, as South Korea's youngest ever swimmer in history (aged 13), at the 1996 Summer Olympics in Atlanta. There, she failed to reach the top 16 final in the 100 m breaststroke, finishing only in thirtieth place at 1:12.85. In the 4×100 m medley relay, Byun. along with Lee Ji-hyun, Park Woo-hee, and Lee Bo-eun, placed eighteenth from the prelims in 4:18.98.

At the 2000 Summer Olympics in Sydney, Byun competed only in the 100 m breaststroke. She achieved a FINA B-cut of 1:11.11 from the Dong-A Swimming Tournament in Ulsan. She challenged seven other swimmers in heat four, including top favorites Sarah Poewe of South Africa and Masami Tanaka of Japan. She rounded out the field to last place in 1:11.64, more than half a second (0.50) below her entry standard and 3.58 behind leader Poewe. Byun failed to advance into the semifinals, as she placed twenty-fifth overall in the prelims.

She was educated at Daejeon Daeheung Elementary School, Daejeon Girls' Middle School, Daejeon Physical Education High School, and Chungnam National University.

References

External links
 

1983 births
Living people
South Korean female breaststroke swimmers
Olympic swimmers of South Korea
Swimmers at the 1996 Summer Olympics
Swimmers at the 2000 Summer Olympics
Swimmers from Seoul
20th-century South Korean women
21st-century South Korean women